Sampaguita Village National High School (SVNHS) or Sampaguita National High School (SNHS) is a public secondary high school located at Calendola Village, San Pedro, Laguna, Philippines. It is offering Junior High School (Grades 7–10) at present.

History
Sampaguita Village National High School, once known as Sampaguita Village Barangay High School, was founded in 1977 through the Barrio High School Charter. It was created through the efforts of the officers of the homeowners association of Sampaguita Village through its president Feliciano Leyson.
On its first year of operation, the school started with two first year and one second year classes with only four teachers. Classes, then, were held inside the compound of Sampaguita Village Elementary School under the supervision of the elementary principal.
In 1979, a portion of the open space in Calendola Village was resolved for the perpetual use of the Sampaguita Village Barangay High School through a Municipal Resolution. In that same year, the school's first owned 3-classroom building was constructed and some of the classes were transferred in Calendola Village.

After the construction of the second 3-classroom building in 1981 all classes from first to fourth year were held in the new school site in Calendola Village and in 1986 the school got its government recognition.

In 1987 all barangay high schools were nationalized and with it the school's supervision was turned-over from the elementary principal to the newly designated Teacher-in-Charge. Consuelo L. Escudero, a math teacher, was designated Teacher-in-Charge in 1988 and became the first principal in 1995 to 2012.

The independence of the newly nationalized high school from the supervision of the elementary principal gave way to the gradual improvement and development of Sampaguita National High School's physical facilities. From then on enrolment soared.
Located in a new barangay, the school adopted the name Sampaguita, the National Flower, and the means of livelihood of most of the people of San Pedro.
Because of the need for additional classrooms due to increase in enrolment, in 1991, a new 2-classroom building was acquired through the concerted efforts of the new school head, the PTA, and the Municipal Mayor, Calixto R. Cataquiz. The building was donated by Levis Strauss, Philippines and a 10% school share of the total building cost of Php 398,000.00 was shouldered by the school. The amount was raised from the donations of the different stakeholders of the school with the help of Mayor Calixto R. Cataquiz. The need for more classrooms increased because of massive increase in enrolment and more teachers were hired.

From SY 2002-2003 up to SY 2004–2005, there was an enrolment overflow and the total number of classrooms can no longer accommodate the number of classes on a regular schedule, thus, shifting of classes in inevitable. To date there are two shifts of classes, 20 in the morning which starts at 6:00 a.m and 200 in the afternoon which starts at 1:00 p.m.

In 2005 an extension of Sampaguita National High School was created in Adelina I Complex  Subdivision in Barangay San Antonio to accommodate students from far flung areas of San Pedro. The creation of the school's extension was made possible through the initiative of Arturo L. Hatulan, the barangay captain of Barangay San Antonio with the support of the then municipal mayor Felicisimo A. Vierneza and Petronila S. Ilustrisimo, the District Supervisor.

Sampaguita National High School Adelina I Complex  Extension is on its fifth year of operation this year with 1,414 students divided into 22 sections, 7 first year, 6 second year, 5 third year, and 4 fourth year. The creation of the new school in Adelina Complex made enrolment in the main campus less crowded.

Location 
Sampaguita National High School is located in Barangay Calendola, San Pedro, Laguna. The barangay is separated from the nearby subdivisions and other barangays by rivers. It is bounded in the north by “Buaya (Crocodile) Creek” where Barangay Sampaguita Village is located, in the east by San Pedro River where Villa Olympia and Harmony Homes subdivisions of barangay San Vicente are situated, in the south and western part is barangay Magsaysay separated by a small stream.

Barangay Calendola Village is 3.2 kilometers away from the municipality of General Mariano Alvarez, Province Of Cavite in the south, 10.2 kilometers from Muntinlupa in the north, and 7.0 kilometers from Biñan proper in the east.

Principals
Names of Former Principals before 1987 are still being searched in the archives.

 Consuelo L. Escudero 1987-2012 
 Angelita B. Delos Reyes - 2012-2014 
 Marina M. De Robles 2014 - June 2016 
 Reginal G. Grafil - June 2016- January 9, 2017 (OIC) 
 Editha V. Rana - January 10, 2017 - January 10, 2018 (PSDS-OIC) 
 John Daniel P. Tec - January 11, 2018 - 2019

References

High schools in the Philippines
Schools in San Pedro, Laguna
1977 establishments in the Philippines
Educational institutions established in 1977